The qilin is a creature in Chinese and other East Asian mythologies. It may refer to:

Qilin may also refer to:
 Qilin District, Qujing, Yunnan
 Qilin, Anhui, a town in Zongyang County

See also
 Kirin (disambiguation)
 Kylin (disambiguation)
 Girin (disambiguation)
 Xilin (disambiguation)